Return to Castle Wolfenstein is a first-person shooter video game published by Activision, released on November 19, 2001, for Microsoft Windows and subsequently for PlayStation 2, Xbox, Linux and Macintosh. The game serves as a reboot of the Wolfenstein series. It was developed by Gray Matter Studios and Nerve Software developed its multiplayer mode. id Software, the creators of Wolfenstein 3D, oversaw the development and were credited as executive producers. The multiplayer side eventually became the most popular part of the game, and was influential in the genre. Splash Damage created some of the maps for the Game of the Year edition. A sequel, titled Wolfenstein, was released on August 18, 2009.

Gameplay

The game is played from the first-person perspective, where the player's task is to perform retrieval missions, sabotage or assassinations. Players can be armed with typical WW2 weaponry and can even use fictional weapons such as a German-made minigun or a Tesla gun. Players can also use stealth to eliminate enemies, with some missions strictly requiring for stealth to be used. Enemies vary from standard soldiers to undead and experimental creatures. Health is replenished by collecting health packs and food. Armor also can be collected for additional protection.

Multiplayer
Multiplayer is an objective-based game mode, in which players are split into two teams—Axis and Allies. Each team has a set of objectives to complete, the Allies usually being to destroy some sort of Axis objective, and the Axis objectives being to defend their objectives. These objectives are split into two categories, primary and secondary. Primary objectives are ones which must be completed for victory, generally stealing secret documents or destroying a radar array; however, secondary objectives are ones which are optional—they do not have to be completed, but if they are they may aid the appropriate team, such as blowing out a door to allow access into a tunnel which shortens travel time or allows less-noticeable infiltration of the enemy base.

Each team has access to a slightly different set of weapons, matching those used by each side in World War II. Players can choose from four different classes: Soldier, Medic, Engineer and Lieutenant. Soldiers can carry heavy weapons, such as the Panzerfaust, Venom Cannon or Flamethrower, which are not available to other classes. Medics can revive and heal other teammates. Engineers can breach obstacles and arm and defuse dynamite. Lieutenants can supply ammo to teammates and are able to call in air strikes.

Each class specializes in a certain aspect of the game, and an effective team will balance players out using all four classes, such as a soldier for blasting through enemy defenses, a medic for supporting the team and keeping them alive (Soldier making up for the lack of firepower with medics, medics making up for the lack of health), a Lieutenant to resupply teammates with ammo (especially soldiers) and engineers to complete the objective, having their way cleared by the soldier which is then supported by the Lieutenant.

There are three different modes of play, each allowing for a different experience—objective, stopwatch, and checkpoint. Stopwatch calls for the Allied side to complete a set of objectives within a predefined time limit. The opposing team then become the Allies and have to complete the objectives in a shorter time than the now Axis. Checkpoint gamemode is a mode in which teams capture flags. It may be more commonly known as Capture the Flag (CTF). Whichever team is first to control all the flags at once, wins. The team-based networked multiplayer features different character classes that must work together in order to win. There are four classes — lieutenant, medic, engineer, and soldier — the soldier can be one of several subclasses depending upon the special/heavy weapon that he selects. The multiplayer demo includes a beachhead assault map similar to Omaha Beach.

Plot

In 1943, assigned to the Office of Secret Actions (OSA) from the military, US Army Ranger William "B.J." Blazkowicz and British operative Agent One are sent into Egypt to investigate activity of the German SS Paranormal Division. The duo find themselves witness to the SS releasing an ancient curse around the dig site, resurrecting scores of zombies from their slumber. Pushing through the mummies and Nazis, B.J. and Agent One are led to an airfield and a location to follow. As they tail the SS, the two are shot down near Austria and captured by the Nazis. Agent One and Blazkowicz are imprisoned in Castle Wolfenstein, a remote, medieval castle that serves as a stronghold, prison, and research station. During their incarceration, Agent One is tortured for information and dies from electrocution. B.J., however, manages to escape Castle Wolfenstein's dungeon and fights his way out of the castle, using a cable car to leave the area and meet up with Kessler, a member of the German resistance in a nearby village.

Meanwhile, the SS Paranormal Division, under Oberführer Helga von Bülow, has long since moved from Egypt and has been excavating the catacombs and crypts of an ancient church within the village itself in search of the resting place of a "Dark Knight". The Division's sloppy precautions have led to the release of an ancient curse and the awakening of hordes of undead creatures, this time including Saxon knights. The majority of the SS finally realize the dangers and seal off the entrance into the catacombs, leaving many soldiers trapped inside. B.J. descends regardless and fights both Nazis and undead until he arrives at the ancient house of worship, the Defiled Church, where Nazi scientist Professor Zemph is conducting a 'life essence extraction' on the corpse of a Dark Knight, which, thanks to some Nazi technology, succeeds. Shortly before B.J.'s arrival, Zemph tries to talk the impatient Helga von Bulow out of retrieving an ancient Thulian artifact, the "Dagger of Warding" from a nearby altar in an isolated area of the church, but she shoots him and proceeds. This final blunder awakens another monster, Olaric, which kills and dismembers her. Blazkowicz, after a heated battle against spirits and demon attacks, defeats Olaric, and then is airlifted out with Zemph's notes and the dagger.

With the lead with Helga seeming to have come to a close, the OSA begins to shift its focus to one of Germany's leading scientific researchers and Head of the SS Special Projects Division, Oberführer Wilhelm "Deathshead" Strasse. Their investigation leads the OSA to realizing that Deathshead is preparing to launch an attack on London. He intends to use a V-2 rocket fitted with an experimental biological warhead, launching it from his base near Katamarunde in the Baltics. Due to the stealthy nature in which the OSA needs to act, Blazkowicz is parachuted some distance from the missile base and separated from his equipment. After collecting his gear, he smuggles himself into a supply truck bound for the base. Once inside, Blazkowicz destroys the V-2 on its launchpad and fights his way out of the facility towards an airbase filled with experimental jet aircraft. There, he commandeers a "Kobra" rocket-plane and flies to safety in Malta.

Eager to know more about Deathshead and his secret projects, the OSA sends Blazkowicz to the bombed-out city of Kugelstadt, where he is assisted by members of the German Kreisau Circle resistance group in breaking into a ruined factory and exfiltrating a defecting scientist. It is there he discovers the blueprints (and prototype) of the Reich's latest weapon, an electrically operated hand-held minigun dubbed the Venom Gun. Blazkowicz eventually breaks into Deathshead's underground research complex, the Secret Weapons Facility. There he encounters the horrific fruits of Deathshead's labors: creatures, malformed, and twisted through surgery and mechanical implants. The creatures escape from their containments and go on a rampage. Blazkowicz fights his way through the facility, only to see Deathshead escape the chaos by U-boat, and learns of his destination by interrogating a captured German officer.

Blazkowicz is then parachuted into Norway, close to Deathshead's mysterious "X-Labs." After breaking into the facility, which has been overrun by the twisted creatures he encountered in Kugelstadt (dubbed 'Lopers'), Blazkowicz retrieves Deathshead's journal, which links Deathshead's research to the rest of the SS Paranormal's occult activity. Finally catching up with Deathshead, Blazkowicz comes face to face with a completed and fully armored Übersoldat, and kills the researchers who have developed it. After the Übersoldat is destroyed, Deathshead escapes in a Kobra rocket-plane and disappears for the rest of the game.

After studying the documents captured by Blazkowicz, the OSA has become aware of a scheme codenamed 'Operation: Resurrection', a plan to resurrect Heinrich I, a legendary and powerful Saxon warlock-king from 943 AD. Despite the skepticism of senior Allied commanders, the OSA parachutes Blazkowicz back near Castle Wolfenstein, at the Bramburg Dam, where he fights his way until he arrives at the village town of Paderborn. After assassinating all the senior officers of the SS Paranormal Division present there for the resurrection, Blazkowicz fights his way through Chateau Schufstaffel and into the grounds beyond. After fighting two more Übersoldaten, Blazkowicz enters an excavation site near Castle Wolfenstein.

Inside the excavation site, Blazkowicz fights Nazi guards and prototype Übersoldaten, and makes his way to a boarded-up entrance to Castle Wolfenstein's underground crypts. There, he finds that the ruined and decaying sections of the castle has become infested with undead creatures, which are attacking the castle's garrison. After fighting his way through the underworkings of the castle, Blazkowicz arrives too late at the site of a dark ceremony to prevent the resurrection of Heinrich I. At the ceremony, SS psychic and Oberführerin Marianna Blavatsky conjure up dark spirits, which transform three of Deathshead's Übersoldaten into Dark Knights, Heinrich's lieutenants. She ultimately raises Heinrich I, who turns her into his undead slave. Blazkowicz destroys the three Dark Knights, the undead Marianna Blavatsky, and eventually Heinrich I. In the distance, Reichsführer-SS Heinrich Himmler remarks how matters have been ruined as he leaves for Berlin to face an expectant Hitler.

Back in the OSA, Operation Resurrection is closed and Blazkowicz is off on some "R&R" — shooting Nazis.

Development
The game was announced in January 2000. Return to Castle Wolfenstein includes a story-based single-player campaign, as well as a team-based networked multiplayer mode.

In the campaign, Allied agents from the fictional "Office of Secret Actions" (OSA) are sent to investigate rumors surrounding one of Heinrich Himmler's personal projects, the SS Paranormal Division (also see Ahnenerbe). The agents are, however, captured before completing their mission and are imprisoned in Castle Wolfenstein. Taking the role of Blazkowicz, the player must escape the castle. The player soon investigates the activities of the SS Paranormal Division, which include research on resurrecting corpses and biotechnology, while also sabotaging weapons of mass destruction such as V-2 rockets and biological warheads. During the game the player battles Waffen SS soldiers, elite Fallschirmjäger (paratroopers) known as Black Guards, undead creatures, and Übersoldaten (supersoldiers) formed from a blend of surgery and chemical engineering conducted by Wilhelm "Deathshead" Strasse. The end boss is an undead Saxon warrior-prince named Heinrich I.

The cable car in the castle is based on the 1968 movie Where Eagles Dare, where a U.S. Army Brigadier General is captured and taken prisoner to the Schloß Adler, a fortress high in the Alps above the town of Werfen, reachable only by cable car, and the headquarters of the German Secret Service in southern Bavaria. The supernatural element is based on the story of Castle Wewelsburg, a 17th-century castle occupied by the Germans under Heinrich Himmler's control, and used for occult rituals and practices.

One of the multiplayer maps (also released individually as the multiplayer demo) depicts Omaha Beach in Operation Overlord, and is inspired by the opening scene of Saving Private Ryan. This put Return to Castle Wolfenstein in competition with another id Tech 3-powered World War II-themed first person shooter, Medal of Honor: Allied Assault which also features its own take on Omaha Beach.

In the German version of the game, it avoids making direct reference to Nazi Party and the "Third Reich", in order to comply with strict laws in Germany. The player is not battling Nazis but a secret sect called the "Wolves" led by Heinrich Höller, whose name is a pun of the original character Himmler (Himmler roughly translates as "Heavener", Höller as "Heller"). The Nazi swastika is also not present: the German forces use a Wolfenstein logo which is a combination of a stylized double-headed eagle prominent in most Nazi symbolism, a "W" (standing for Wolfenstein), and the Quake III: Team Arena "QIII" logo (the game engine and network code that Return to Castle Wolfenstein is based upon). The "W" eagle logo is prominently seen on the cover art for the American version.

Music pieces such as Beethoven's Moonlight Sonata and Für Elise are used in the single-player campaign.

Some sound effects in the game are excerpts heard in the 1968 movie 2001: A Space Odyssey. A radar station and the X-Labs levels of the game feature these sounds prominently to give the effect of working scientific equipment at a research facility.

The game is powered by a modified version of the id Tech 3 engine, with changes made to support large outdoor areas. The Return to Castle Wolfenstein engine was subsequently used as the foundation for Wolfenstein: Enemy Territory (Splash Damage/Activision), Trinity: The Shatter Effect (Gray Matter Studios/Activision) (shown at E3 in 2003, but assumed cancelled) and Call of Duty (Infinity Ward/Activision).

There are many different releases of Return to Castle Wolfenstein. The original release, version 1.0, came in a game box featuring a book-like flap. A Collector's Edition, packaged in a metal case, was released at the same time. The contents of the Collector's Edition changed depending on when it was purchased and could include a poster and fabric patch, a poster and a bonus CD, or just the bonus CD. The Game of the Year Edition (2002 - v.1.33) came with the original Wolfenstein 3D, game demos, and seven new multiplayer maps (Trenchtoast, Tram Siege, Ice, Chateau, Keep, The Damned, and Rocket.) The Platinum Edition (2004 - v.1.41) included Wolfenstein: Enemy Territory, a stand-alone multiplayer expansion, and Wolfenstein 3D. Return to Castle Wolfenstein: Tides of War also came with the original Wolfenstein 3D as an unlockable after beating the campaign, and included some enhancements like surround sound.

Ports
The game was released for Linux and Macintosh platforms in 2002, with the Linux port done in-house by Timothee Besset and the Mac port done by Aspyr Media. In 2003, the game was ported to the PlayStation 2 and Xbox video game consoles and subtitled as Operation Resurrection and Tides of War, respectively.

Console version differences
Both console versions include an additional single-player prequel mission, set in the fictional town of Ras El-Hadid in Egypt. The latter half of the level features an extensive underground burial site with many undead enemies, as does the original first mission. This prequel level is likely closer to the developers' true intentions for the story, as indicated by the distinctly Egyptian design of the burial site, including the presence of sand, traps, mummies and hieroglyphs on the walls in some areas (in the original storyline, this site is found in the middle of a German village during the second mission). By contrast, the single-player storyline in the Windows version starts at Castle Wolfenstein.

The PS2 version has a bonus feature which allows players to purchase items at the end of each level by finding secrets. In the Xbox version a Secret Bonus is awarded after every level when all the secret areas for that level have been found. It also has several new equipable items and weapons as well as new enemies. The two-player co-op mode is exclusive to Xbox and allows the second player to play as Agent One, altering the game in which he was never killed and played out the missions to the end. This allows for the story to support that Agent One either survived. Xbox version also has downloadable content, system link play and had online multiplayer via Xbox Live before Live play was disabled for original Xbox games. A Platinum Hits edition of the game was also released for the Xbox. The PlayStation 2 version does not support online multiplayer.

Completing the Xbox version unlocks a further bonus: the original Wolfenstein 3D.

Source code release
The source code for Return to Castle Wolfenstein and Enemy Territory was released under the GNU General Public License v3.0 or later on August 12, 2010. The ioquake3 developers at icculus.org announced the start of respective engine projects soon after.

Community mods 
On 15 October 2020 a community overhaul mod RealRTCW was released on Steam as a free modification for original game. It features new renderer, expanded arsenal, rebalanced gunplay, new high-quality models, textures and sounds.

Film
A Return to Castle Wolfenstein film was announced in 2002 with Rob Cohen attached to direct. Little information has been available since, however, with the exception of a July 20, 2005 IGN interview. The interview discussed the Return to Castle Wolfenstein film with id employees. In the interview, Todd Hollenshead indicated that the movie was in the works, though still in the early stages.

On August 3, 2007, Variety confirmed Return to Castle Wolfenstein, to be written and directed by Roger Avary and produced by Samuel Hadida. On November 2, 2012, Roger Avary has signed on to write and direct the film. The film is being described as a mix of Inglourious Basterds and Captain America.

Reception

Sales
Return to Castle Wolfenstein debuted at #3 on NPD Intelect's computer game sales chart for the November 18–24 period, at an average retail price of $57. It fell to position 7 in its second week. By the end of 2001, the game's domestic sales totaled 253,852 units, for revenues of $13.1 million.

In the United States, Return to Castle Wolfenstein sold 350,000 copies and earned $17 million by August 2006. It was the country's 48th-best-selling computer game between January 2000 and August 2006. Combined sales of all Wolfenstein computer games released between January 2000 and August 2006 had reached 660,000 units in the United States by the latter date. Return to Castle Wolfenstein received a "Silver" sales award from the Entertainment and Leisure Software Publishers Association (ELSPA), indicating sales of at least 100,000 copies in the United Kingdom. By January 2002, Activision reported that shipments of Return to Castle Wolfenstein to retailers had surpassed one million units. The game sold 2 million copies by January 2004.

Reviews

Return to Castle Wolfenstein received favorable reviews from critics. At Metacritic, it scores 88/100 (based on 32 reviews), and on GameRankings it scores 87% (based on 50 reviews). Eurogamer Tom Bramwell called Return to Castle Wolfenstein "a worthy addition to the stable of id Software affiliated shoot 'em ups. The single-player game is average to good and takes quite a while to finish, but the game really earns its salt by shipping with a first class multiplayer element."

GameSpot named Return to Castle Wolfenstein: Tides of War the best Xbox game of May 2003.

Controversy
In March 2008, the United States Department of State published a report to Congress, "Contemporary Global Anti-Semitism", that described Return to Castle Wolfenstein as an "anti-Semitic video game" with no qualifications. The report picked up on an article originally written in 2002 by Jonathan Kay of The New York Times regarding the recent introduction of "Nazi protagonists" in the online gaming market (referring specifically to Day of Defeat and Wolfenstein). The article was published just 19 days before Medal of Honor: Allied Assault was released, which shares many similar features and Nazis as playable characters in multiplayer.

Todd Hollenshead, chief executive of id Software at the time of the original article stated:
The trend you're seeing with new games is, to some extent, a reflection of what's going in the culture ... For instance, you've now got games with terrorists and counterterrorists. And World War II games such as Return to Castle Wolfenstein and Day of Defeat reflect what you see in popular movies ... I don't doubt there are going to be people that go out and distort what the multiplayer gaming experience is and say, "Oh, I can't believe you guys did this." There are a lot of critics of the game industry, and they look for things to criticize.

Awards

PC Gamer US awarded Return to Castle Wolfenstein its 2001 "Best Multiplayer Game" prize. The editors wrote: "No other FPS rewards this level of teamplay, sports this kind of graphics, or is this blissfully free of cheaters."

Sequels
A multiplayer-only spinoff of the series, Wolfenstein: Enemy Territory, was originally planned as a full-fledged expansion pack for Return to Castle Wolfenstein developed by Splash Damage. The single-player component of the game was never completed and thus was removed entirely. The developers at that point decided the multiplayer part would be released as a free, downloadable standalone game. Enemy Territory is a team-based networked multiplayer game which involves completing objectives through teamwork using various character classes.

This gameplay was later reutilized in a full-fledged commercial game Enemy Territory: Quake Wars set in id Software's Quake universe. A semi-sequel called Wolfenstein was developed by Raven Software and id Software and published by Activision, and released on August 18, 2009. A successor to Wolfenstein titled Wolfenstein: The New Order and a standalone prequel expansion titled Wolfenstein: The Old Blood have also been released in 2014 and 2015. The Old Blood references RTCW with characters with similar names and the X-labs being mentioned.

The New Order storyline was followed up in Wolfenstein II: The New Colossus which was released in late 2017.

References

External links
Official id Software website

2001 video games
Activision games
AROS software
Aspyr games
Commercial video games with freely available source code
Cooperative video games
Experimental medical treatments in fiction
First-person shooters
Gray Matter Studios games
Id Software games
Id Tech games
Interactive Achievement Award winners
Linux games
MacOS games
MorphOS games
Multiplayer online games
PlayStation 2 games
Splash Damage games
Video games about Nazi Germany
Video games scored by Bill Brown
Video games set in castles
Video games set in Egypt
Video games set in Germany
Video games set in Norway
Video game reboots
Windows games
Wolfenstein
World War II first-person shooters
Xbox games
Video games about zombies
D.I.C.E. Award for Action Game of the Year winners
D.I.C.E. Award for Adventure Game of the Year winners
D.I.C.E. Award for Online Game of the Year winners
Video games developed in the United States